Franco Andreoli (2 December 1915 – 5 February 2009) was a Swiss football forward who managed Switzerland in the 1950 FIFA World Cup. He also played for FC Lugano.

References

1915 births
2009 deaths
Swiss men's footballers
Switzerland international footballers
Association football forwards
FC Lugano players
Swiss football managers
Switzerland national football team managers
1950 FIFA World Cup managers